|}

The Woodcote Stakes is a conditions flat horse race in Great Britain open to two-year-old Thoroughbreds. It is run over a distance of 6 furlongs and 3 yards (1,210 metres) at Epsom Downs in late May or early June.

History
The Woodcote Stakes, initially spelled Woodcot, was first run in 1794. It was run over the last half-mile of Epsom Downs Racecourse. Colts carried 8 st, with fillies carrying 7 st 1 lb.

The race was not run between 1800 and 1806, but was re-established in 1807 and run over the last six furlongs of Epsom track. Colts carried 8 st 3 lb, with fillies carrying 8 st 0 lb. The following year the race was reduced in distance to half a mile and the weights the horses carried increased by two pounds. The weights rose by a further pound in 1812. In 1839 the race was moved to the new two-year-old course and the distance was increased to six furlongs. In 1842 the subscription fee was set at 15 sov. The weights were also changes, with horses carrying one pound less and the winner of the Two-year-old Stakes at Gorhambury carrying a five-pound penalty. In 1844 the subscription was reduced to 10 sov. In 1847 the weights were returned to what they were before 1842 and the penalty was removed.

Winners of the race have included Leamington, Cremorne, Surefoot, Ladas, Sceptre, The Tetrarch, My Babu and My Swallow.

The Woodcote Stakes held Listed status prior to 2017 when it was downgraded, and is currently sponsored by Cazoo.

Winners 1794-1799

Winners 1807-1852

Winners since 1988

See also
 Horse racing in Great Britain
 List of British flat horse races

References

 Paris-Turf:
 , 
 Racing Post:

Epsom Downs Racecourse
Flat horse races for two-year-olds
Flat races in Great Britain
Recurring sporting events established in 1807
1807 establishments in England